Robert, or RoBERT (born Myriam Roulet in Paris on 14 October 1964), is a French singer, composer and lyricist.

An independent artist and songwriter, Robert's musical style is described as fairy-like, halfway between the tragic and the gothic, sometimes with a pinch of absurdity. Themes of death, childhood, and love regularly appear in her songs, marked by her crystalline, often fragile opera voice and the baroque (and sometimes electronic) music. Often compared to Mylène Farmer, Barbara or Marie Laforêt, she has found artistic success in France and Belgium, but also in Japan, despite a certain media absence. Robert's live shows are often full of hypnotic, giddy, often joyful or even dramatic performances.

Early career
Before becoming a singer, Robert pursued a career as a classical ballet dancer studying in the Opéra National de Paris, until a bone decalcification forced her to abandon her dream when she was only a teenager. After a short involvement in the field of acting, she began to dedicate herself to music. Since then, she has collaborated mainly with her husband Mathieu Saladin, musician and often co-compositor.

In November 1990, Robert released her first single, "Elle se promène", partially produced by Neal Aston in London. This first song aired frequently on French radio and even became a dance hit in Japan. The music, together with the cold atmosphere of its music video directed by John Lvoff, attracted the interest of Mylène Farmer, who invited the young artist to join her in two radio shows. Robert therefore appeared with Mylène Farmer and even performed in one of the shows presented by Nagui.

Sine
Three years later, in 1993, she released her debut album Sine, which featured 16 songs. She has been working for at least five years until the album finally materialized. Sonically and aesthetically, its style can be well described as having an underground cold-techno direction, gathering influences from children's fairytales and urban, glacial, inhuman images.

Notable moments of that period were her collaboration with the French director Michel Gondry in the futuristic video of "Les Jupes" as well as her participation in Jean-François Coen's first album, providing her fragile voice in some of the songs, one of them being "La Tour de Pise", the video of which was once again directed by Michel Gondry. Next to that, she accompanied Cohen for a live performance of "La Tour de Pise" on the French TV show Taratata.

Princesse de rien
In 1997, Robert released her second album, Princesse de rien, which comprised twelve songs. The album reflected a complete change in her musical style, using ancient baroque instruments blended with electronic loops and modern choreographic structures.

In the same year, she met a fervent admirer: the Belgian prolific writer Amélie Nothomb. Nothomb went on to write "L'appel de la succube", interpreted by the singer on the second edition of Princesse de rien released in 2000. Around the same period, Robert gave her first Parisian concert in the Café de la Danse.

Celle qui tue & Unutma
In September 2002, Robert released her third album, Celle qui tue, comprising 14 songs. The album stylistically featured a more electronic sound and illustrated Robert's image metamorphosis from a princess-like style into a witch/siren artistic representation. Amélie Nothomb wrote the lyrics for six of the songs of Celle qui tue and published The Book of Proper Names, a romanticized biography of Robert.

Unutma (N'oublie pas) was a compilation of old and (three) new songs released in 2004, one of the new songs was "Unutma" and it was sung in Turkish. A particular track from Robert's previous studio album, "Le Prince bleu", caught the attention of American actress Majandra Delfino, who wanted to collaborate with the artist and whom subsequently Robert paid a visit in California in 2003 in order to record a new version of the song, finally included in Unutma. This duet gave also birth to a computer animated video, that received several awards worldwide. "Nickel" was furthermore remixed by Romain Tranchart in 2003.

In 2005, she released her first live DVD from her 2004 artistically acclaimed performance in La Cigale.

Six pieds sous terre
In November 2005, Robert recorded her fourth album, Six pieds sous terre, featuring more acoustic instrumentation (harpsichord, clarinet, harp, violins, flute) and more dramatic, fairy-like atmosphere than her previous works. The album included eleven songs written by Robert, as well as a cover of Marie Laforêt's "Prière pour aller au paradis", and a duet ("Histoire du loup") with actor Sacha Bourdo. French film director Gabriel Aghion directed his first ever music video for the album's first single, "Personne".

On 5 February 2006, Robert performed in Paris's legendary Olympia music hall, for the first time in her sixteen-year career. Two new songs were added to the album's 2007 re-edition, including "Cold Earth", an adaptation of Henry Purcell's "Cold Song", well known by Klaus Nomi's interpretation.

Recent career
In November 2006, Robert signed with a new distributor, Rue Stendhal. Coming with the deal, all her albums were re-released in January 2007 and became available after being out of stock for many years. Additionally in the beginning of 2007, she released Princess of Nowhere, a collection of some of her old songs plus two new re-orchestrated "Mike" and "Fatal", all adapted and sung in English. A DVD of her recital Haute Couture at Espace Pierre Cardin in Paris was released in October 2007.

A year later, in late 2008, she recorded her new studio album under the title Sourde et aveugle, collaborating once again with her husband Mathieu Saladin and also Austyn, a young French blues musician with whom she sang "Le jardin des roses". Acoustic guitars fused with her feminine often childlike ethereal voice marked the new sound of the album.

In 2009, Givenchy chose Robert to perform the soundtrack of the TV commercial for their latest fragrance, Ange ou Démon le secret. The ad, directed by the famous Indian director Mira Nair and starring Uma Thurman, aired worldwide in September 2009. The song was additionally used by one of Michelle Phan's videos.

Nuit Gravement is the title of her sixth studio album recorded in Transylvania. For the first single she duets with the French actor Anthony Delon while the Italian choreographer Giuliano Peparini directed its video.

In 2017 she divorced Mathieu Saladin (ex composer and musician) and launched her new independent label "Légendaire"

In 2021 she released her first album under Légendaires 'Le chant des égarés', Sauveur Carlus is in charge of the design and illustrations.

Discography

Studio albums 
 Sine (1993)
 Princesse de rien (1997)
 Celle qui tue (2002)
 Six pieds sous terre (2005)
 Sourde et aveugle (2008)
 Nuit gravement (2012)
 Aux marches du palais (2012)
 Le Chant des égarés (2021)

Live albums 
 Robert live à la Cigale (2005)
 Haute Couture (2008)

Compilation albums 
 Unutma (N'oublie pas) (2004)
 Princess of Nowhere (2007)

Singles
 Elle se promène (1990)
 Les Jupes (1991)
 Les Clichés de l'ennui (1993)
 Princesse de rien (2000)
 Nickel (2000)
 Colchique mon amour (2001)
 À la guerre comme à la guerre (promo single) (2002)
 Le Prince bleu (duet with Majandra Delfino) (maxi CD/DVD) (2004)
 Nickel (remixed by Romain Tranchart) (2004)
 Personne (radio edit remixed by Romain Tranchart & Grégory Louis) (2005)
 Histoire de loup (duet with Sacha Bourdo) (2006)
 Tout est calme (2008)
 Sorry (maxi CD) (2009)
 Ange & Démon (2009)
 La Revolution (2013)
 Taste of your tongue (2013 - E.P. digital)
 Débutante (2014 - E.P. digital)
 L'otage de tes pardons (2020-single digital)

Music videos

Filmography
 Le voyage en douce (1980) – Robert, credited as Myriam Roulet, appears as a young Geraldine Chaplin
La chambre des dames (1983) – Robert plays Blanche in this television film
 L'école des femmes (1989) – a theatrical comedy play written by the 17th century French playwright Molière

External links
 RoBERT le site (official website)
 Official MySpace
 Site of her label DEA
 Fan site

French dance musicians
French women singers
French singer-songwriters
1964 births
Living people